En ettas dagbok is a 1985 TV series, based on the Max Lundgren book series Åshöjdens BK about a fictional Swedish soccer sports club team in Skåne called that same name.

References

External links
The series at SVT's open archive 

1985 Swedish television series debuts
1985 Swedish television series endings
Fictional association football television series
Scania in fiction
Sveriges Television original programming
Television shows set in Sweden